Lac Brochet Airport  is located  east of Lac Brochet, Manitoba, Canada.

Airlines and destinations

References

External links

Certified airports in Manitoba

Transport in Northern Manitoba
Keewatin Tribal Council